This is a list of public art in Israel.

This list applies only to works of public art accessible in an outdoor public space. For example, this does not include artwork visible inside a museum.

Jerusalem District

Jerusalem

|}

Givat Ram, Jerusalem

|}

Israel Museum

|}

Yad Vashem

|}

Mevaseret Zion

|}

Tel Aviv District

Tel Aviv-Yafo

|}

Tel Aviv Museum of Art

|}

Tel Aviv University

|}

Abu Nabut Park, Tel Aviv-Yafo 

|}

Bat Yam

|}

Givatayim

|}

Mikveh Israel 

|}

Misgav 

|}

Moledet 

|}

Ramat Gan

|}

Ramat Ef'al

|}

Haifa District

Haifa

|}

Avi Ran Sculpture Garden

|}

Technion - Israel Institute of Technology

|}

University of Haifa

|}

Hadera

|}

Kiryat Tivon

|}

Kiryat Yam

|}

Northern District

|}

Ein Harod

|}

Atlit

|}

Golan Heights

|}

Kfar Uria

|}

Kiryat Shmona

|}

Ma'alot-Tarshiha

|}

Nazareth Illit

|}

Rosh Pina

|}

Lohamei HaGeta'ot

|}

Tefen Open Museum

|}

Tel Hai

|}

Central District

Hadera

|}

Kfar Saba

|}

Petah Tikva

|}

Raanana

 
 
 
 
 
 
 
 
 
 
 
 
 
|}

Ramat Hasharon

|}

Herzliya

|}

Netanya

|}

Netzer Sereni

|}

Ashdod

|}

Holon

|}

Lod

|}

Moshav Sitria

|}

Rehovot

|}

Rishon LeZion

|}

Southern District

Arad

|}

Ashkelon

|}

Beersheba

|}

Dimona

|}

Eilat

|}

Ein Bokek

|}

Ein Gedi

|}

Mitzpe Ramon Desert Sculpture Park

|}

Other

|}

The Open Museum, Omer Industrial Park 

|}

See also
 National Register of Historic Places listings in Israel, in Hebrew. Created for "Wiki Loves Monuments 2012" Israeli project link
 A list of Israeli Outdoor Artwork compiled for Wiki Loves Monuments 2012 competition by the Information Center for Israeli Art, (Hebrew).
 Wiki Loves Public Art in Israel 2013 project site

References

 The list of outdoor sculptures throughout Israel was created by a team of museum curators and Information Center for Israeli Art staff. This list represents outdoor art created by Israeli artists whose artwork is found within the collections of the Israel Museum, Jerusalem.

 
Public art in Israel
Sculptures in Israel